"One Hand, One Heart" is a song from the musical West Side Story by Leonard Bernstein and Stephen Sondheim. It is a duet sung between Maria and Tony while they have a make-believe wedding, as seen in the stage version and 1961 film, while in the 2021 film, they sing it as they pledge their love to one another inside a church at The Cloisters as part of their date. Larry Kert and Carol Lawrence introduced it in the 1957 Broadway production.


Analysis
The tune was originally composed for an unused song in Candide, called "One". The original tune comprised just a single dotted note per bar, which Sondheim was loath to write lyrics for, as he would have to write all single syllable words, so he wrote lyrics making fun of the tune to persuade Bernstein to give him the extra notes. Sondheim later wrote of the final product:

Philip Brophy analysis the song's context within the musical:

Notable recordings
Larry Kert and Carol Lawrence – for the album West Side Story (Original Broadway Cast) (1957)
Jim Bryant and Marni Nixon – West Side Story (Original Sound Track Recording) (1961).
Vic Damone – a single release in 1963.
Dionne Warwick – included in her album On Stage and in the Movies (1967)
Vince Hill – for his album Edelweiss (1967).
Kiri Te Kanawa and José Carreras – for the album Leonard Bernstein Conducts West Side Story (1985)
Neil Diamond – for his album Lovescape (1991)
Barbra Streisand and Johnny Mathis – Back to Broadway (1993)
Rickie Lee Jones (with Joe Jackson) – for her album It's Like This (2000)
Ansel Elgort and Rachel Zegler – West Side Story (Original Motion Picture Soundtrack) (2021)

References

Songs from West Side Story
Songs with music by Leonard Bernstein
Songs written by Stephen Sondheim
1957 songs